Thuir (Catalan: Tuïr) is a commune in the Pyrénées-Orientales department, southern France.

Geography 
Thuir is located southwest of Perpignan, in the canton of Les Aspres and in the arrondissement of Perpignan. It is situated in a plain between the natural zones of the Aspres and the Riberal.

Population

See also
Communes of the Pyrénées-Orientales department

References

External links

 Information in Catalan Encyclopaedia

Communes of Pyrénées-Orientales